Dhunibeshi is a municipality located within the Dhading District of the Bagmati Province of Nepal. The municipality spans , with a total population of 31,029 according to a 2011 Nepal census.

On March 10, 2017, the Government of Nepal restructured the local level bodies into 753 new local level structures. The previous Naubise, Chhatre Dyaurali and Jiwanpur VDCs were merged to form Dhunibeshi. Dhunibeshi is divided into 9 wards, with Naubise declared the administrative center of the municipality.

Demographics
At the time of the 2011 Nepal census, Dhunibeshi Municipality had a population of 31,029. Of these, 77.1% spoke Nepali, 18.8% Tamang, 2.9% Newar, 0.3% Maithili, 0.2% Bhojpuri, 0.1% English, 0.1% Hindi, 0.1% Magar, 0.1% Tharu, 0.1% Urdu and 0.1% other languages as their first language.

In terms of ethnicity/caste, 28.1% were Tamang, 24.3% Hill Brahmin, 21.3% Chhetri, 6.4% Newar, 4.5% Sarki, 3.0% Magar, 2.9% Rai, 2.1% Kami, 1.6% Damai/Dholi, 1.5% Sanyasi/Dasnami, 0.9% Gharti/Bhujel, 0.7% Danuwar, 0.7% Thakuri, 0.4% Musalman, 0.2% Chepang/Praja, 0.2% Tharu, 0.1% Bhote, 0.1% Gurung, 0.1% Hajam/Thakur, 0.1% Halwai, 0.1% Jirel, 0.1% Kalwar, 0.1% Kathabaniyan, 0.1% Teli, 0.1% Yadav and 0.3% others.

In terms of religion, 81.0% were Hindu, 16.3% Buddhist, 2.1% Christian, 0.4% Muslim, 0.1% Prakriti and 0.1% others.

References

External links
official website of the rural municipality

Municipalities in Dhading District
Nepal municipalities established in 2017